The Chief of Naval Personnel (CNP) is responsible for overall manpower readiness for the United States Navy. As such the CNP is the highest ranking human resources officer in the Navy. The CNP also serves as Deputy Chief of Naval Operations (Manpower, Personnel, Training and Education) and is one of five Deputy Chiefs of Naval Operations, with the identification of N1/NT. The CNP oversees the operations of the Bureau of Naval Personnel (BUPERS), Navy Personnel Command (NPC) and the Navy Manpower Analysis Center (NAVMAC). The CNP and the other four DCNOs are nominated by the President of the United States and must be confirmed via majority vote by the Senate. The CNP and the DCNOs are appointed as a three-star vice admiral while holding office.

The role of Chief of Naval Personnel and Deputy Chief of Naval Operations (Manpower, Personnel, Training & Education) go hand in hand. The DCNO performs all strategy and resource policies and serves as a single resource sponsor for all manpower and training program matters. The DCNO also performs all Capitol Hill related duties, including all Congressional testimony for matters pertaining to the Manpower, Personnel, Training, & Education command. The DNCO's office also acts as the lead organization to interface with Department of Defense (DOD) and Department of the Navy (DON) officials, other U.S. military and foreign departments, other Navy commands, other Federal agencies, and private organizations.

List of Chiefs

The Bureau of Navigation held the responsibilities for personnel management of the United States Navy until 1942, when the Bureau of Naval Personnel was established. Below is the list of Chiefs of the Bureau of Navigation and the Bureau of Naval Personnel:

See also
Chief of Naval Operations
Bureau of Navigation (United States Navy)

References

Flag appointments of the United States Navy
P*